The Eddington luminosity, also referred to as the Eddington limit, is the maximum luminosity a body (such as a star) can achieve when there is balance between the force of radiation acting outward and the gravitational force acting inward. The state of balance is called hydrostatic equilibrium. When a star exceeds the Eddington luminosity, it will initiate a very intense radiation-driven stellar wind from its outer layers. Since most massive stars have luminosities far below the Eddington luminosity, their winds are mostly driven by the less intense line absorption. The Eddington limit is invoked to explain the observed luminosity of accreting black holes such as quasars.

Originally, Sir Arthur Eddington took only the electron scattering into account when calculating this limit, something that now is called the classical Eddington limit. Nowadays, the modified Eddington limit also counts on other radiation processes such as bound-free and free-free radiation (see Bremsstrahlung) interaction.

Derivation
The limit is obtained by setting the outward radiation pressure equal to the inward gravitational force. Both forces decrease by inverse square laws, so once equality is reached, the hydrodynamic flow is the same throughout the star.

From Euler's equation in hydrostatic equilibrium, the mean acceleration is zero,

If the pressure is dominated by radiation pressure associated with a radiation flux ,

Here  is the opacity of the stellar material which is defined as the fraction of radiation energy flux absorbed by the medium per unit density and unit length. Note that  is defined as the energy flux over a surface, which can be expressed with the momentum flux using  for radiation.

The luminosity of a source bounded by a surface  may be expressed with these relations as

Now assuming that the opacity is a constant, it can be brought outside of the integral. Using Gauss's theorem and Poisson's equation gives

where  is the mass of the central object. This is called the Eddington Luminosity. For pure ionized hydrogen,

The maximum luminosity of a source in hydrostatic equilibrium is the Eddington luminosity. If the luminosity exceeds the Eddington limit, then the radiation pressure drives an outflow.

The mass of the proton appears because, in the typical environment for the outer layers of a star, the radiation pressure acts on electrons, which are driven away from the center. Because protons are negligibly pressured by the analog of Thomson scattering, due to their larger mass, the result is to create a slight charge separation and therefore a radially directed electric field, acting to lift the positive charges, which are typically free protons under the conditions in stellar atmospheres. When the outward electric field is sufficient to levitate the protons against gravity, both electrons and protons are expelled together.

Different limits for different materials
The derivation above for the outward light pressure assumes a hydrogen plasma. In other circumstances the pressure balance can be different from what it is for hydrogen.

In an evolved star with a pure helium atmosphere, the electric field would have to lift a helium nucleus (an alpha particle), with nearly 4 times the mass of a proton, while the radiation pressure would act on 2 free electrons. Thus twice the usual Eddington luminosity would be needed to drive off an atmosphere of pure helium.

At very high temperatures, as in the environment of a black hole or neutron star, high energy photon interactions with nuclei or even with other photons, can create an electron-positron plasma. In that situation the combined mass of the positive-negative charge carrier pair is approximately 918 times smaller (the proton to electron mass ratio), while the radiation pressure on the positrons doubles the effective upward force per unit mass, so the limiting luminosity needed is reduced by a factor of ≈ 918×2.

The exact value of the Eddington luminosity depends on the chemical composition of the gas layer and the spectral energy distribution of the emission. A gas with cosmological abundances of hydrogen and helium is much more transparent than gas with solar abundance ratios. Atomic line transitions can greatly increase the effects of radiation pressure, and line driven winds exist in some bright stars (e.g., Wolf-Rayet and O stars).

Super-Eddington luminosities

The role of the Eddington limit in today's research lies in explaining the very high mass loss rates seen in for example the series of outbursts of η Carinae in 1840–1860. The regular, line driven stellar winds can only stand for a mass loss rate of around 10−4–10−3 solar masses per year, whereas mass loss rates of up to 0.5 solar masses per year are needed to understand the η Carinae outbursts. This can be done with the help of the super-Eddington broad spectrum radiation driven winds.

Gamma-ray bursts, novae and supernovae are examples of systems exceeding their Eddington luminosity by a large factor for very short times, resulting in short and highly intensive mass loss rates. Some X-ray binaries and active galaxies are able to maintain luminosities close to the Eddington limit for very long times. For accretion-powered sources such as accreting neutron stars or cataclysmic variables (accreting white dwarfs), the limit may act to reduce or cut off the accretion flow, imposing an Eddington limit on accretion corresponding to that on luminosity. Super-Eddington accretion onto stellar-mass black holes is one possible model for ultraluminous X-ray sources (ULXs).

For accreting black holes, not all the energy released by accretion has to appear as outgoing luminosity, since energy can be lost through the event horizon, down the hole. Such sources effectively may not conserve energy.  Then the accretion efficiency, or the fraction of energy actually radiated of that theoretically available from the gravitational energy release of accreting material, enters in an essential way.

Other factors 
The Eddington limit is not a strict limit on the luminosity of a stellar object. The limit does not consider several potentially important factors, and super-Eddington objects have been observed that do not seem to have the predicted high mass-loss rate. Other factors that might affect the maximum luminosity of a star include:

Porosity. A problem with steady winds driven by broad-spectrum radiation is that both the radiative flux and gravitational acceleration scale with r −2. The ratio between these factors is constant, and in a super-Eddington star, the whole envelope would become gravitationally unbound at the same time. This is not observed. A possible solution is introducing an atmospheric porosity, where we imagine the stellar atmosphere to consist of denser regions surrounded by lower density gas regions. This would reduce the coupling between radiation and matter, and the full force of the radiation field would only be seen in the more homogeneous outer, lower density layers of the atmosphere.
Turbulence. A possible destabilizing factor might be the turbulent pressure arising when energy in the convection zones builds up a field of supersonic turbulence. The importance of turbulence is being debated, however.
Photon bubbles. Another factor that might explain some stable super-Eddington objects is the photon bubble effect. Photon bubbles would develop spontaneously in radiation-dominated atmospheres when the radiation pressure exceeds the gas pressure. We can imagine a region in the stellar atmosphere with a density lower than the surroundings, but with a higher radiation pressure. Such a region would rise through the atmosphere, with radiation diffusing in from the sides, leading to an even higher radiation pressure. This effect could transport radiation more efficiently than a homogeneous atmosphere, increasing the allowed total radiation rate. In accretion discs, luminosities may be as high as 10–100 times the Eddington limit without experiencing instabilities.

Humphreys–Davidson limit

Observations of massive stars show a clear upper limit to their luminosity, termed the Humphreys–Davidson limit after the researchers who first wrote about it. Only highly unstable objects are found, temporarily, at higher luminosities.  Efforts to reconcile this with the theoretical Eddington limit have been largely unsuccessful.

See also
 Hayashi limit
 List of most massive stars

References

External links

External links
 Surpassing the Eddington Limit.

Astrophysics